The Sonata for Two Pianos in D major, K. 448, is a work composed by Wolfgang Amadeus Mozart in 1781, when he was 25. It is written in sonata-allegro form, with three movements. The sonata was composed for a performance he would give with fellow pianist Josepha Auernhammer. Mozart composed this in the galant style, with interlocking melodies and simultaneous cadences. This is one of his few compositions written for two pianos.

Description 

The sonata is written in three movements:

Allegro con spirito
The first movement sets the tonal center with a strong introduction. The two pianos divide the main melody for the exposition, and when the theme is presented, both play it simultaneously. Little time is spent in the development section; a new theme is introduced (unlike most sonata forms) before the recapitulation, repeating the first theme.
Andante
The second movement is written in ABA form.
Molto allegro
The third movement begins with a galloping theme. The cadences used in this movement are similar to those in Mozart's Rondo alla Turca.

Mozart effect

Mozart's K 448 was the composition used in the original study that led to the theory of the so-called Mozart effect, which posited that listening to the piano sonata improved spatial reasoning skills, later widened in pop-science to an increase in IQ in general.

Notes

External links
 
 Recording of Sonata for Two Pianos in D major by Sivan Silver and Gil Garburg (archived on the Wayback Machine)
 

Piano sonatas by Wolfgang Amadeus Mozart
Compositions for two pianos
1781 compositions
Compositions in D major